Gush was Lowlife's fifth and final album, released in 1995.  The LP was recorded at Mighty Reel Studios in Edinburgh, Scotland. It was released on the Anoise Annoys Records label, the only Lowlife title not to be released by Nightshift Records.

Track listing
All tracks composed by Lowlife
"Bleach"
"Kiss Me Kick"
"Former Compadre"
"Truth in Needles"
"Tocopherol"
"Loaded, Primed and Pulled"
"Wicked Papa Tantalus"
"Patricide"
"Swell"

Personnel
Lowlife 
Craig Lorentson - vocals
Hugh Duggie - guitar
Will Heggie - bass guitar
Greg Orr - drums
Additional musicians
Jason Taylor  - guitars, bass, keyboards, sampling. Co -writer of all tracks except one
Jennifer Bachen - backing vocals
Bepop & Bigwar - keyboards, samples

Lowlife (band) albums
1995 albums